Silas Kopf (born 1949) is an American furniture maker specializing in the art of marquetry.  Kopf graduated from Princeton University in 1972 with a degree in architecture and soon began designing and making furniture.  In 1988, he received a Craftsman's Fellowship from the National Endowment for the Arts, and used the opportunity to study traditional marquetry technique at the École Boulle, an institute of interior architecture and design, in Paris.  His major projects include several pianos commissioned by Steinway & Sons and benches, desks, and cabinets for private collections and museums.  His designs frequently incorporate floral depictions, other images from nature, and trompe-l'œil concepts. He first became interested in marquetry because he hoped for an alternative, less consumerist lifestyle.

Kopf was named Master of the Medium by the James Renwick Alliance of the Smithsonian Institution for 2015. This biennial award recognizes American craftspeople in the fields of wood, ceramics, glass, metal, and fiber.

Since 1978, he has worked in Easthampton, Massachusetts, where he continues to build and design. He has an assistant, Tom Coughlin, who also designs and builds guitars.

References

External links
 Boston Globe article about Kopf
 The Master Techniques of Marquetry (DVD Review)
 Kopf's Business Website

1949 births
Living people
American furniture makers
Trompe-l'œil artists
Princeton University alumni